Sir John Harrington of Hornby, Lancashire (before 1336 – 1359), was a fourteenth-century knight and founder of the medieval Harrington dynasty in the North of England, known as the Harringtons of Farleton and Hornby. They were a cadet branch of the Harringtons of Aldingham, Sir John being the second son of the first Lord Harrington, who died in 1347.  At some point he married Katherine Banaster of Bolton. Sir John the younger held Farleton manor jointly with Katherine  for a peppercorn rent of an annual payment of one rose, and suit at his father's court. In 1354, Henry, Duke of Lancaster granted Harrington a lease of a manor in Hornby; Harrington already held Bolton-le-Moors, Chorley, and Aighton, jure uxoris. He died on 1 August 1359: his lands passed in quick succession to his eldest son, Robert, to his brother Thomas (who both died in 1361), and thence to his Harrington's youngest son Nicholas.

References

Younger sons of barons
1359 deaths
Knights Bachelor
People from Lancaster, Lancashire
14th-century English people